is a 2009 Japanese film directed by Kengo Kaji, described as ero guro action film. Special effects were produced by Yoshihiro Nishimura, who previously directed and created effects and makeup for Tokyo Gore Police, which Kengo Kaji wrote.

Plot
Samurai Princess takes place sometime, somewhere in an alternate universe version of feudal Japan, where people live together with highly developed mechanical dolls called "Mechas". However, excessively developed mechanical dolls start causing harm to human society, leading to ghastly bloodshed happening all over the place. Under the circumstances, Kyoraku, a mad scientist, creates a female ninja mechanical doll. Equipped with eleven types of built-in weapons, the ninja doll is also infused with the souls of eleven of her fallen sisters. She uses their combined power to take down anyone who stands in her way. Virtually indestructible, the ninja is on a quest to save humanity.

Cast
 Aino Kishi as Gedōhime (Samurai Princess)
 Dai Mizuno as Gekko
 Asuka Kataoka as Renjyo
 Mao Shiina as Mikaduki
 Miki Hirase as Mangetsu
 Sarasa Tani as Ruri
 Yū Aiba as Himawari
 Yukari Tateishi as Kogiku
 Rui Nanase as Koume
 Omu Taketomi as Samo
 Hiroyuki Kajima as Kujira
 Kentarō Shimazu as Shachi
 Mihiro as Kocho
 Mitsuru Karahashi as Kyoraku

Release
On June 20, 2009 Samurai Princess appeared in the New York Asian Film Festival. The film was first released theatrically in Japan on July 25, 2009 and a Japanese DVD version of the film came out on October 23, 2009. A version of the DVD with English subtitles was released on November 17, 2009. A second and third sequel were announced as of the time of the time of the American DVD release.

See also
Cinema of Japan

Notes

External links
Official site of the film

 Review at 10kbullets.com 
 Review at Twitchfilm.net 

2000s Japanese-language films
Japanese science fiction action films
2009 films
2009 science fiction action films
Japanese splatter films
2000s Japanese films